Torre-Cardela is a municipality located in the province of Granada, Spain. According to the 2004 census (INE), the city had a population of 1,134.

References

Municipalities in the Province of Granada